Selayang may refer to:
Selayang
Selayang (federal constituency), represented in the Dewan Rakyat